Samtiden is a Norwegian political and literary magazine.

History and profile
Samtiden was founded by Jørgen Brunchorst and Gerhard Gran in 1890. The magazine's first publisher was John Griegs forlag (Bergen), and from 1900 Aschehoug (Oslo).

Gran was the magazine's editor from 1892 to 1925. As of 2002 Thomas Hylland Eriksen was the editor-in-chief of the magazine. Cathrine Sandnes was editor-in-chief since 2006 to 2014.

Samtiden is a member of the Eurozine network.

Editors

1892–1925: Gerhard Gran
1925–1963: Jacob Worm-Müller (except 1940–1942)
1940–1942: Andreas Hofgaard Winsnes
1963–1969: John Sanness 
1969–1979: Torkel Opsahl 
1979–1988: Editorial committee (including Helge Rønning,  and others)
1989–1993: Trond Berg Eriksen 
1993–2001: Thomas Hylland Eriksen
2001–2006: Knut Olav Åmås 
2006–2014: Cathrine Sandnes 
2014–2016: Different editor for each issue:
 4/2014: Lena Lindgren
 1/2015: Espen Søbye
 2/2015: 
 3/2015: 
 4/2015: Torgrim Eggen
 1/2016: Marta Breen
 2/2016: Christian Kjelstrup
 3–4/ 2016: 
2017– : Christian Kjelstrup

References

External links
Official website

1890 establishments in Norway
Magazines established in 1890
Magazines published in Oslo
Norwegian-language magazines
Literary magazines published in Norway
Political magazines published in Norway
Mass media in Bergen
Quarterly magazines published in Norway